Vanadium(V) fluoride is the inorganic compound with the chemical formula VF5. It is a colorless volatile liquid.  It is a highly reactive compound, as indicated by its ability to fluorinate organic substances.

Properties and structure 
The compound is exclusively a monomer in the gas phase. In the gas phase it adopts D3h symmetric trigonal bipyramidal geometry as indicated by electron diffraction. As a solid, VF5 forms a polymeric structure with fluoride-bridged octahedral vanadium centers. 

The formation enthalpy of VF5 is -1429.4 ± 0.8 kJ/mol.

It is the only known pentahalide of vanadium.

Synthesis
Vanadium pentafluoride can be prepared by fluorination of vanadium metal: 
 2 V  +  5 F2  →  2 VF5
Alternatively, disproportionation of vanadium tetrafluoride yields equal amounts of the solid trifluoride and the volatile pentafluoride:
2 VF4  →   VF3  +  VF5
This conversion is conducted at 650 °C.  It can also be synthesized by using elemental fluorine to fluorinate industrial concentrates and raw materials so as to produce VF5 on an industrial scale. VF5 can be synthesized from the reaction of raw materials such as metallic Vanadium, ferrovanadium, vanadium (V) oxide and vanadium tetrafluoride with elemental fluorine.

VF5 ionises in the liquid state as reflected by the high values of Trouton's constant and electrical conductivities.

Characteristics and Reactivity
Interest in this highly corrosive compound began in the fifties when there were extensive studies of its physicochemical properties. It is a powerful fluorinating and oxidizing agent.  It oxidizes elemental sulfur to sulfur tetrafluoride:.
S  + 4 VF5 →    4 VF4  +  SF4

Like other electrophilic metal halides, it hydrolyzes, first to the oxyhalide:
VF5  +  H2O   →   VOF3  + 2 HF
Then to the binary oxide:
2 VOF3 + 3 H2O   →   V2O5  +  6 HF
Hydrolysis is accelerated in the presence of base. Despite its tendency to hydrolyze, it can be dissolved in alcohols.

It is a Lewis acid, as illustrated by its formation of the hexafluorovanadate:
VF5  +  KF   →   KVF6

Vanadium pentafluoride is a weaker acid and mainly undergoes oxidative and fluorinating reactions.

The compound fluorinates unsaturated polyfluoroolefins into polyfluoroalkanes. 

The compound dissolves without reaction in liquid Cl2 and Br2.   VF5 is moderately soluble in HF.

References

Other reading
 Arnold F. Holleman, Nils Wiberg: Lehrbuch der Anorganischen Chemie, 102. Auflage, de Gruyter, Berlin 2007, S. 1545, .

Vanadium(V) compounds
Fluorides
Metal halides
Fluorinating agents
Inorganic polymers
Coordination polymers